El Paso Natural Gas (EPNG) is an American company with a system of natural gas pipelines that brings gas from the Permian Basin in Texas and the San Juan Basin in New Mexico and Colorado to West Texas, New Mexico, Nevada, California, and Arizona.  It also exports some natural gas to Mexico.

The company is owned by Kinder Morgan, Inc.  Though Kinder Morgan is based in Houston, the El Paso Natural Gas company is based in Colorado Springs, Colorado.

History
Historically, EPNG's primary market was California, though the growth of competing pipelines into that market and lack of increased demand since 2001 has led to a decrease in its business there, especially in Southern California. At the same time, EPNG's shipping into Arizona has increased, largely because it was the only pipeline into the fast-growing Phoenix area until the TransWestern Phoenix Lateral came in service Q1 2009.

Its largest customers are Southern California Gas Company (a Sempra Energy subsidiary); Southwest Gas Corporation; and Pacific Gas and Electric Company. Its FERC code is 33.

October 1945: In light of depletion of reserves in California by the war and expected future growth. EPNG proposes building 720 miles of 26-inch pipeline ($19.8m) to supply California markets with gas from the Permian Basin in Lea County, New Mexico, work to be finished in the spring or summer of 1947. Line is to end at the Colorado River where it is to connect to the Southern California Gas Company system. Additionally planned are 117 miles (24-inch), 32 miles (18-inch) and 14.5 miles (14-inch) of gathering pipelines ($3.4m). 105,000,000cuft/day compressor station, dehydration and purification plant at Jal, New Mexico ($2.2m). Limit of 300,000,000cuft/day with additional compressor stations. total cost $25.4m. The line became operational on 13 November 1947.

Pipelines
 Tennessee Gas Pipeline
 Ruby Pipeline

See also 

 Blue Flame Building

References

External links
Pipeline Electronic Bulletin Board

Natural gas companies of the United States
Kinder Morgan
Natural gas pipelines in the United States
Natural gas pipelines in Mexico
Companies based in Colorado Springs, Colorado
Energy in Colorado
Energy in New Mexico
Petroleum in California
Petroleum in Texas
American companies established in 1928
Non-renewable resource companies established in 1928
1928 establishments in Colorado
Natural gas pipelines in Texas
Natural gas pipelines in New Mexico
Natural gas pipelines in Colorado
Natural gas pipelines in Nevada
Natural gas pipelines in California
Natural gas pipelines in Arizona